Kainga is a settlement on the southern bank of the Waimakariri River, just north of Christchurch, in Canterbury, New Zealand. It lies immediately to the south of Kaiapoi, on a small road leading northeast from SH 1

Originally established as a small group of fishing huts on the south side of the Waimakariri, it later developed into a small residential area. A small forestry plantation lies to the southeast of the settlement.

Demographics
It is part of the wider Styx statistical area.

Kainga had a population of 195 at the 2018 New Zealand census, a decrease of 6 people (-3.0%) since the 2013 census, and unchanged since the 2006 census. There were 81 households. There were 105 males and 93 females, giving a sex ratio of 1.13 males per female. The median age was 39.6 years (compared with 37.4 years nationally), with 36 people (18.5%) aged under 15 years, 33 (16.9%) aged 15 to 29, 105 (53.8%) aged 30 to 64, and 21 (10.8%) aged 65 or older.

Ethnicities were 93.8% European/Pākehā, 16.9% Māori, 3.1% Pacific peoples, 1.5% Asian, and 1.5% other ethnicities (totals add to more than 100% since people could identify with multiple ethnicities).

Although some people objected to giving their religion, 75.4% had no religion, 16.9% were Christian and 3.1% had other religions.

Of those at least 15 years old, 15 (9.4%) people had a bachelor or higher degree, and 48 (30.2%) people had no formal qualifications. The median income was $31,200, compared with $31,800 nationally. The employment status of those at least 15 was that 84 (52.8%) people were employed full-time, 24 (15.1%) were part-time, and 6 (3.8%) were unemployed.

References

Populated places in Canterbury, New Zealand